This is a list of products manufactured by the Hershey Company. Some of these products began production over 100 years ago such as the Hershey Kiss and Hershey Bar. Hershey produces a variety of products that are chocolate or candy based, and The Hershey Company also produces gum.  This list excludes licensed items such as beer, cereal, ice cream and chocolate milk, which are made by brands like Yuengling, General Mills, Breyers, Good Humor, Klondike, and Natrel. The main market is Continental North America (U.S. and Canada).

Chocolate-based candies 
Hershey's produces a large variety of chocolate based products. Hershey is also licensed to produce Cadbury products  as well as the Kit Kat bar and Rolo candies (which are both owned by Nestlé).

Bars
 Almond Joy, coconut topped with almonds and covered in milk chocolate
 Cadbury Dairy Milk, various products, all made with milk chocolate
 Dagoba Organic Chocolate, selling specialty chocolate bars, baking chocolate, cacao powder, chocodrops, and drinking chocolate
 Dream (called Cadbury White in the UK), made of white chocolate
 5th Avenue, peanut butter crunch layers covered in chocolate
 Heath bar, toffee and almonds in milk chocolate
 Hershey bar
 Hershey's Drops
 Hershey's Extra Dark
 Hershey's Kisses
 Hershey's Kisses Special Selection (sold only in the Philippines)
 Hershey's Miniatures
 Hershey's Special Dark, which consists of 45% cacao solids
 Oh Henry!, containing peanuts, caramel and fudge
 Kit Kat
 Krackel, crisped rice in chocolate
 Military chocolate, a part of the standard United States military ration
 Mounds, coconut covered in dark chocolate
 Mr. Goodbar, consisting of peanuts in chocolate
 Nutrageous
 Reese's Fast Break, a chocolate bar with peanut butter filling
 Reese's Peanut Butter Cups
 Reese's Sticks
 Reese's Take 5
 Scharffen Berger Chocolate Maker, primarily produced chocolate bars using small-batch processing and focusing on dark chocolate varieties with high cocoa solid content
 Skor, butter toffee covered in milk chocolate
 Snack Barz, crisped rice held together with marshmallow and coated with milk chocolate
 Symphony
 Whatchamacallit
 Zero bar, caramel, peanut and almond nougat covered in white chocolate fudge

Other
 Cadbury Creme Egg
 Cherry Blossom,  a maraschino cherry and cherry syrup surrounded by a mixture of chocolate, shredded coconut and roasted peanut pieces
 Hershey's Kissables
 Milk Duds
 Rolo
 Swoops
 York Peppermint Pattie
 Whoppers, malted milk balls with an artificially flavored "chocolatey coating"

Non-chocolate products
 Breath Savers, breath mints
 Bubble Yum, bubble gum
 Good & Fruity
 Good & Plenty
 Ice Breakers candy, mints and chewing gum
 Jolly Rancher
 Lancaster Soft Crèmes
 PayDay, a candy bar of salted peanuts rolled over a nougat-like sweet caramel center
 Pelon Pelo Rico, a tamarind-flavored candy originating in Mexico
 Reese's Pieces
 SkinnyPop, dairy-free popcorn
 Twizzlers
 Zagnut, a candy bar of peanut butter surrounded by toasted coconut

References

External links
 Hershey's brand product details from Hershey's site

Hershey
Hershey Company